Nilton Pacheco de Oliveira, also commonly known as Nilton Pacheco (July 26, 1920 – June 26, 2013) was a Brazilian basketball player who competed in the 1948 Summer Olympics in London, United Kingdom. There he won the bronze medal with the men's national basketball team under the guidance of head coach Moacyr Daiuto. He was born in Salvador, Bahia.

References

External links
 Profile
 Profile

1920 births
2013 deaths
Brazilian men's basketball players
Olympic basketball players of Brazil
Basketball players at the 1948 Summer Olympics
Olympic bronze medalists for Brazil
Olympic medalists in basketball
Medalists at the 1948 Summer Olympics
Sportspeople from Salvador, Bahia